Virginia Mariani, born Virginia Barlocci, (1824–1898) was an Italian painter, active in Rome. She was known for her portraits in watercolors and oils. She also worked in ceramics.

Biography
Virginia Barlocci studied in Rome with her first husband Bernardino Riccardi, who died in 1854. At the 1875 Mostra provinciale of Perugia, she displayed life-size half-busts. She gained an honorary associate membership in the Umbrian Academy of Fine Arts. She was also an honorary associate of the Accademia dei Virtuosi of the Pantheon. Mrs Mariani worked in ceramics. She was a private tutor in the arts, and also taught at various Roman institutes and was inspector of the municipal schools. Her husband was the painter Cesare Mariani. She died in Rome in 1898.

References

1824 births
1898 deaths
19th-century Italian painters
Italian women painters
19th-century Italian women artists
Painters from Rome